Top Floor, Left Wing (Dernier étage, gauche, gauche) is a 2010 French comedy film. It won the Panorama FIPRESCI Award at the Berlin International Film Festival in 2011.

Plot
Three men in a banlieue are mistaken for terrorists and get targeted by a French SWAT team.

Cast
 Hippolyte Girardot as François Echeveria
 Mohamed Fellag as Mohand Atelhadj
 Aymen Saïdi as Salem (Akli) Atelhadj
 Lyes Salem as Hamza Barrida
 Thierry Godard as Commandant Villard
 Michel Vuillermoz as the prefect
 Judith Henry as Anna Echeveria
 Julie-Anne Roth as Lieutenant Saroyan

References

External links

French comedy films
2010s French films